Methylobacterium pseudosasicola  is a Gram-negative, non-spore-forming strictly aerobic, facultatively methylotrophic and motile bacteria from the genus Methylobacterium which has been isolated together with Methylobacterium phyllostachyos from the surface of a bamboo leaf.

References

Hyphomicrobiales
Bacteria described in 2014